Faranah Airport  is an airport serving the city of Faranah in Guinea.

See also

Transport in Guinea
List of airports in Guinea

References

External links
 SkyVector - Faranah Badala Airport
 OurAirports - Faranah Airport
 OpenStreetMap - Faranah Airport
 FallingRain - Faranah

 Google Earth

Airports in Guinea